Vincent Michael Scanlan, T.O.R. (December 1, 1931 – January 7, 2017) was a Catholic priest of the Franciscan Third Order Regular. He was responsible for the revival of the College of Steubenville, now known as Franciscan University of Steubenville. Scanlan served the university for 26 years as president and then 11 years as chancellor, before retiring in 2011. He resided at the Sacred Heart Province motherhouse in Loretto, Pennsylvania, prior to his death on January 7, 2017.

Biography

Early life 
Scanlan was born on December 1, 1931, in Cedarhurst, New York, a small village on the South Shore of Long Island, to Margaret O'Keefe Scanlan and Vincent Scanlan. When he was three, his parents separated. His father moved to Mexico, while his mother remarried and moved to New York City. Scanlan remained with his mother in New York and was heavily affected by the social and cultural dispositions of New York City. The community that Scanlan was raised in was predominantly lower-class Irish families; because of this, he grew to despise the rich. However, his parents and his stepfather were all concerned with success, especially monetary success, and they tried to force this mentality upon Scanlan. He adopted this disposition and began seeking perfection in his academics, athletics, and social life. This attitude did not last long; Scanlan's restless nature never allowed him to do the same thing for too long. In his autobiographical work, Let the Fire Fall, Scanlan stated: "I decided that I could do anything, but not everything. I could live with lower grades if my goal for the semester was to become captain of the tennis team, as I did in prep school, or to become socially popular, as I strived to do in college. If a course bored me, I would settle for a 'B'."

Young Scanlan's restlessness allowed him to compromise in some areas of his life, but he was always a man of devout Roman Catholic faith. Although his mother had left the Roman Catholic Church after her separation, she brought him up in the faith and encouraged him to be faithful to the Church, even though she was not. Scanlan's stepfather, though, hated the Church and took every opportunity to denounce it.

Scanlan's faith deepened as he grew older, despite the religious turmoil at home. At Coindre Hall Boarding School on Long Island, Scanlan was able to deepen his faith under the instruction of the Brothers of the Sacred Heart, who ran the school. He credits one particular brother, Brother Bertin Ryan, S.C., as being vital in his faith formation. In his autobiography, Scanlan states: "Brother Bertin combined the highest standards for personal conduct and academic performance with an irresistible loving nature." It was this kind of attitude that left a lasting impression upon Scanlan; he quickly took his faith as a metaphor for his life. This paradigm change caused Scanlan to conquer his restless attitude and quickly reach the top of his class.

Scanlan graduated from Coindre Hall and received a scholarship to New Hampton School, a college preparatory school in New Hampshire. Scanlan graduated from New Hampton at the top of his class and received an all-around excellence medal.

College years 
After graduating from prep school, Scanlan entered Williams College in Massachusetts. Scanlan performed well academically, but his Roman Catholic faith was shaken by the secular approach of his professors. Scanlan found himself questioning the existence of God. In a moment of frustration, he reports leaving the college, going out to the nearby woods, and remaining there for half a day, promising that he would not leave the woods until God gave him strong conviction. That evening, Scanlan felt the presence of God. This experience redirected his entire life; Scanlan returned to the Roman Catholic faith with renewed effort.

Scanlan graduated from Williams College and was accepted into Harvard Law School. During his second year, he had exhausted himself by attempting to become the top student. This endeavor caused him to be hospitalized with the flu and exhaustion. During his period of sickness, Scanlan once again re-examined his life. He became determined to live out his faith again as he had done as a boy. However, he found this very difficult while finishing his degree at Harvard Law School. (During the summer following his second year of law school, he worked as a student legal assistant in the office of the United States Attorney for the Southern District of New York working on cases involving organized crime.)

Walking back to Harvard Law School from Mass one morning, Scanlan felt the presence of God once again. At that moment, he understood that God was calling him to the Roman Catholic priesthood. Scanlan was profoundly amazed by the spiritual revelation, but decided to finish his degree first.

Early career 
Scanlan graduated from Harvard Law School and immediately received job offers from legal and political circles. However, he needed to complete his military service in the Air Force before he could consider taking a job. He served as a lawyer in the Judge Advocate Corps of the Air Force. He did not lose a single case during his first year. This success won him a position as a certified Judge Advocate in 1956.

Priesthood 
Scanlan followed his old calling toward the priesthood, despite his success as a lawyer. He felt the conviction to join a religious order rather than serve as a diocesan priest. In his search for an appealing order, Scanlan spent time with the Jesuits, Dominicans, and Franciscans and consulted with theologian Fr. Avery Dulles, S.J. who advised him, "what does Jesus want?" He entered the Franciscans Third Order Regular (T.O.R.).

He began his seminary formation at the St. Francis Seminary in Loretto, Pennsylvania, in September 1957. A year later, he traveled to Washington, D.C., where he began his novitiate. The majority of his seminary training was spent in philosophy, theology, and Latin courses, which helped him to confirm his vocation.

Scanlan was ordained in May 1964, taking the name Fr. Theophane Scanlan, T.O.R., offering his first Mass, before family and friends, at St. Joseph's Church in Garden City, New York. A reception was held at the Garden City home of his aunt and uncle Gloria and Frank Polignani. As a new priest, Father Michael desired to become a missionary, but his superiors would not allow it. He was disappointed, but he returned to prayer and maintained an open mind about his future.

In Steubenville 
In May 1964, Scanlan was offered the position of academic dean at the College of Steubenville in Steubenville, Ohio. He accepted, and took the position in August 1964. As academic dean, Scanlan's primary responsibility was restructuring the dwindling academic program.

However, his work was not restricted to the classrooms. Scanlan worked extensively with the Protestant and African-American communities in Steubenville, trying to bring the entire town together. Scanlan established ground-breaking connections between the Protestant and Roman Catholic communities by taking part in Protestant services. Scanlan also helped to incorporate African-Americans into leadership positions in the town, especially as policemen.

Not all of Scanlan's work in Steubenville was successful. One failure was his invention of the civic group, Citizens for Clean Air (CCA). Steubenville was a highly industrialized area, and pollution was a serious problem for the town. The CCA attempted to inform the public about new anti-pollution technologies and other practices to cut down on industrial pollution. Unfortunately, the many steel mills and other factories in Steubenville ignored the group. The CCA was unable to make any changes to improve the quality of air in Steubenville.

Return to the seminary 
After five years at the college, Scanlan accepted the position of rector at St. Francis Seminary, where he had begun his seminary formation. At the seminary, Scanlan began a charismatic renewal based on prayer and community. He encouraged strong personal prayer among the seminarians and emphasized the importance of spiritual direction. Scanlan also helped the seminarians to bond with each other through the use of small prayer groups. The renewal yielded mixed results; the small prayer groups were well attended, but the idea of charismatic personal prayer was not well accepted. Despite some visible successes, St. Francis Seminary was closed in 1978 due to a lack of interest in the Franciscan order.

Remaking the College of Steubenville 
In 1974, Scanlan left the St. Francis Seminary and returned to the College of Steubenville, this time to fill the position of president. Since Scanlan had left the school in July 1969, it had declined greatly in enrollment and revenue.  As president, Scanlan aimed to institute a charismatic renewal similar to the one at St. Francis Seminary. Scanlan took over the Sunday liturgy on the campus, incorporating charismatic praise and worship and passionate preaching into the Mass. He instituted households, small groups of men and women devoted to personal and communal growth, and required students to join one. Scanlan also created a renewal center on the campus, which organized retreats and seminars to further instruct students in the Roman Catholic faith. The center began holding religious conferences in the summers, which attracted many young people to the college. Scanlan often spoke at these conferences.

Despite these changes, the college struggled to stay open. The first year after Scanlan instituted the changes, the incoming freshman class was the smallest that the college had ever seen. Five of the top administrators at the college left or were dismissed.

Despite these difficulties, Scanlan continued to make changes, especially to the curriculum. Scanlan reintroduced a theology program, which quickly became the top major at the college. Scanlan also oversaw the development of graduate programs in business and theology, which helped the college win the title of university in 1980. In addition, the nursing program rose to distinction. It was chartered by the state government of Ohio in 1984 and then received accreditation from the National League of Nursing in 1985.

Scanlan orchestrated numerous other beneficial changes to the university. He instituted an Oath of Fidelity to the Magisterium, which was required of the theology professors at the university. Under his guidance, the undergraduate theology program became the largest of any Roman Catholic university in America. He also created the Human Life Studies minor, the only one of its kind in America. By 2000, Scanlan's leadership and changes had helped the university to increase dramatically in size; there were more than 2,100 students, nearly double the amount in the early 1970s.

Charismatic Renewal Affiliations 
Scanlan was a prolific figure in the charismatic covenant community movement, acting in leadership roles in the Sword of the Spirit and Word of God (community).
Scanlan led the covenant community group Servants of Christ the King, until he was requested to step down in 1991 at the behest of Bishop Albert Ottenweller, following concerns that the group had been influenced by elements in the Word of God (community) and Sword of the Spirit organisations, where leadership was said to be "excessively controlling members lives, including their marital relations and finances".

Retirement and death 
After 26 years as president of the university, Scanlan stepped down in 2000. The board of trustees for the university, however, asked him to take the position of chancellor. He accepted, and maintained a lively presence on the campus until his retirement in 2011. Scanlan returned to Loretto and resided at the Sacred Heart Province motherhouse until his death. Scanlan died on January 7, 2017, after a long illness.

Scandal 
A revelation came about in late 2018 that a former chaplain at Franciscan of Steubenville, Father Sam Tiesi, had engaged in years-long abuse of women at the university. It has been reported by multiple victims that they made Father Scanlan aware but he did nothing or, in at least one case, verbally assaulted the accuser. Instead of dealing with the abuse he participated in covering up and silencing those who would report his close friend, Father Tiesi.

Legacy 

 The Franciscan University of Steubenville hosts an annual full tuition scholarship competition, called the Fr. Michael Scanlan Scholarship Competition. While each year only two participants are awarded full tuition scholarships, all participants are welcomed into the exclusive Fr. Michael Scanlan Scholarship Society.
 In 2012 the university announced the creation of the Father Michael Scanlan, TOR, Chair of Biblical Theology and the New Evangelization.

Quotes
 "The work we do is of eternal importance because, like it or not, people will have eternal happiness or eternal misery according to what we do." 
 "Joy isn't a feeling that we can conjure up at will.  Rather it is a response to a life being lived the way God wants it, a holy life free of sin."
 "Repentance is the essential first step in building, rebuilding, or renewing our relationship with the Lord."
 "The greatest healing is the healing of the ravages of sin."
 "Renewal rings in the new, but authentic renewal always involves a return to the roots in the living tradition of the past."

References

External links
Fr. Michael Scanlan website

1931 births
2017 deaths
Third Order Regular Franciscans
Heads of universities and colleges in the United States
People from Cedarhurst, New York
Williams College alumni
Harvard Law School alumni
Franciscan University of Steubenville faculty
Saint Francis University alumni
New Hampton School alumni